Richard M. Erdall (January 13, 1933 – July 3, 2018) was an American politician. He was the 40th mayor of Minneapolis, Minnesota, serving for one day, on December 31, 1973; as such, he is the shortest-serving mayor of the city. Before that, he was alderman for the City's 13th Ward and the president of the Minneapolis City Council. In 1965, Erdall was elected to the Minneapolis Park Board. On January 13, 1967 (his 34th birthday), he was appointed 13th Ward alderman to fill the vacancy caused by the election of John W. Johnson to the Minnesota legislature. Erdall was elected to the council in 1967 and reelected in 1969 and 1971. He was elected president of the city council on July 7, 1969, and reelected in 1971. On August 13, 1971, Erdall was ousted as president when a member of his caucus sided with the DFL to elect himself president. On January 28, 1972, Erdall was restored to the presidency, which he held until January 2, 1974. He was defeated for reelection as alderman in November 1973. The opportunity to serve as mayor arose because the incumbent mayor, Charles Stenvig, a former police inspector who had also been defeated for reelection, resigned on his final day in office to become acting Chief of Police.

In 1976, Erdall received the Independent-Republican nomination in the contest to represent Minnesota's 5th Congressional district, which was then represented by seven-term incumbent (and future Minneapolis mayor) Donald M. Fraser. He received less than 26% of the vote, as Fraser was reelected. He was born in Minneapolis and died there on July 3, 2018 at the age of 85, survived by his children Richard, Kristen, and Susan.

References

Further reading
 

Mayors of Minneapolis
1933 births
2018 deaths
20th-century American politicians
Minnesota Republicans
Minneapolis City Council members